Leithen Water is a tributary of the River Tweed in Scotland. It rises in the Moorfoot Hills and joins the Tweed near the town of Innerleithen, whose name comes from the Scottish Gaelic inbhir, meaning a confluence, and anglicised as "inner" or "inver". The Brythonic equivalent is "Aber". "Leithen" is a Celtic name meaning grey in colour (c.f. Welsh llwydion).

In Innerleithen the river is about 6–7 metres across and is not deep enough to swim. Leithen Water is a local favourite for the children who wade, 'guddle' fish (catch fish with hands) and play about in it. In the summer months, local children build small dams to deepen it, especially at the Cauld (a fish ladder near Innerleithen Golf Course) and at Leithen Bridge. The latter is an old stone bridge, erected in 1799 using funds from a stipend, to enable easy access for townsfolk to attend church on the west side of the Leithen Water.

Leithen Water is usually cool and clear, however post heavy rain it can become quite murky.

The river lends its name to the character Sir Edward Leithen in a number of novels by John Buchan.

Tributaries of the River Tweed
Rivers of the Scottish Borders
1Leithen